The territory of the United States and its overseas possessions has evolved over time, from the colonial era to the present day. It includes formally organized territories, proposed and failed states, unrecognized breakaway states, international and interstate purchases, cessions, and land grants, and historical military departments and administrative districts. The last section lists informal regions from American vernacular geography known by popular nicknames and linked by geographical, cultural, or economic similarities, some of which are still in use today.

For a more complete list of regions and subdivisions of the United States used in modern times, see List of regions of the United States.

Colonial era (before 1776)

Thirteen Colonies

 Connecticut Colony
 Delaware Colony
 Province of Georgia
 Province of Maryland
 Province of Massachusetts Bay
 Province of New Hampshire
 Province of New Jersey
 Province of New York
 Province of North Carolina
 Province of Pennsylvania
 Colony of Rhode Island and Providence Plantations
 Province of South Carolina
 Colony and Dominion of Virginia

Pre-Revolutionary War regions

† - indicates failed legal entities

New England
 Acadia
 Dominion of New England†
 Equivalent Lands
 King's College Tract
 Provinces of Maine†
 Territory of Sagadahock
 Popham Colony (or Sagadahoc Colony)†
 Gorges-Mason Grant†
 Mason Lands
 Gorges Patent†
 Lygonia Patent†
 New Somersetshire†
 Muscongus Patent (also known as the Waldo Patent and, eventually, the Bingham Purchase)
 Massachusetts Bay Colony
 Narragansett Country†
 New Hampshire Grants
 New Haven Colony
 Plymouth Colony
 Saybrook Colony
 Wessagusset Colony†

Mid-Atlantic
 Granville District
 East Jersey
 West Jersey
 New Netherland and its settlements
 New Sweden†

Southern
 Province of Carolina
 Fort Caroline†
 Charlesfort†
 La Florida
 San Agustín (St. Augustine)
 San Miguel de Gualdape† (in present-day South Carolina)
 Mocama Province†
 Jamestown
 Northern Neck Proprietary (or "Fairfax Grant")
 The Lost Colony of Roanoke†
 Stuarts Town†

Interior

 District of West Augusta
 Illinois Country
 Indiana Company
 The Indian Reserve
 Ohio Country (or The Ohio Company of Virginia)†
 Province of Quebec (lower portion below the Great Lakes)

Far West
Unlike the land to the east, most of the land west of the Mississippi River was under French or Spanish rule until the first years of the 19th century.
 La Louisiane (French Louisiana, 1682–1762 and 1802–1803)
 Arkansas Post
 The German Coast
 Luisiana (Spanish Louisiana, 1762–1802)
 Tejas
 Fort Saint Louis†
 Santa Fe de Nuevo México
 Las Californias

Colonies settled but unrecognized
 Transylvania†
 Watauga Republic

Colonies proposed but unrealized
 Charlotina Colony
 Mississippi Colony
 Vandalia Colony
 Westsylvania

Independent entities later joined to the Union
 Kingdom of Hawaii, later the Republic of Hawaii
 Republic of Texas
 Vermont Republic (also known as the Republic of New Connecticut)

Regions purchased from foreign powers

 Louisiana Purchase, 1803, from France, for $15,000,000
 Florida Purchase (or the Spanish Cession), 1819 (effective 1821), from Spain, for $5,000,000; included: East Florida, West Florida, and Sabine Free State or Neutral Ground
 Gadsden Purchase, 1853, from Mexico, for $10,000,000
 Alaska Purchase (also called "Seward's Folly"), 1867, from Russia, for $7,200,000
 Virgin Islands, 1917, from Denmark, for $25,000,000

Regions annexed from or ceded by foreign powers
 American Samoa; 1899, from Germany
 The Aroostook War Compromise Lands; 1842, split jointly claimed areas with the U.K.
 Maine–New Brunswick Border
 Republic of Indian Stream
 South Acadia
 Northwest Angle
 Rupert's Land south of the 49th parallel
 Guam; 1898, from Spain
 Mexican Cession; effective 1848, from Mexico, including:
 Alta California (California, Nevada, Utah)
 Nuevo México (New Mexico, Arizona, parts of Texas, Colorado, Oklahoma, Wyoming, Kansas)
 Provisional New Mexico
 Oregon Country (U.S.); the 1846 Oregon Treaty finally split the jointly governed region (called Columbia by the English) between the U.S. and United Kingdom at the 49th parallel
 Pembina Region, formerly part of Rupert's Land and the Red River Colony; (often referred to as the British Cession of 1818) to U.S. in an exchange for the unorganized territory of the original Louisiana Purchase lands north of the 49th parallel
 The Philippine Islands; 1898, from Spain; became a U.S. Territory (1900–1935) and a U.S. commonwealth (1935–1946)
 Puerto Rico; 1898, from Spain
 Texas annexation; annexed from Mexico in 1846, including most of present-day Texas and parts of Oklahoma, Colorado, Wyoming and No Man's Land; disputed with Mexico until the end of the Mexican–American War in 1848
 included old Coahuila y Tejas areas
 Republic of West Florida Annexation; seceded from Spain, 1810; disputed with Spain until 1821
 Baton Rouge District (annexed by the U.S., 1810)
 Mobile District (annexed by the U.S., 1812)
 United States Minor Outlying Islands; most claimed under the Guano Islands Act as outside the jurisdiction of other nations (1856 and later)

Ceded or purchased Native American regions

 Black Hawk Purchase; $640,000; purchased 1832; Michigan Territory (eventually Iowa)
 Cherokee Outlet; $7,000,000; purchased 1893; Oklahoma Territory (eventually Oklahoma)
 Cherokee Strip; a disputed two-mile wide tract of land between the Cherokee Nation and Kansas that was eventually ceded to Kansas in 1866
 Jackson Purchase; $300,000; purchased by Tennessee and Kentucky from the Chickasaw Nation in 1818
 Lovely's Purchase; 1816 land purchase from the Osage Nation
 Platte Purchase; $7,500; purchased 1836; Missouri
 Saginaw Cession; ceded 1819; Michigan Territory (eventually Michigan)

Interstate, territorial, and federal cessions

The following are state cessions made during the building of the U.S.
 The Delaware Wedge, dispute with Pennsylvania settled in 1921.
 Washington, D.C.; to the Federal Government from Virginia and Maryland, 1790.
 District of Columbia retrocession; the return to Virginia of the District of Columbia lands which Virginia had originally ceded for its creation, 1847.
 Greer County, Texas; a disputed county claimed both by Texas and the Federal Government; to Oklahoma Territory, 1896.
 The Honey Lands; a disputed tract of land between the Territory of Iowa and State of Missouri; to State of Iowa, 1851
 District of Kentucky; from Virginia; became the Commonwealth of Kentucky, 1792.
 Illinois County; from Virginia; became Northwest Territory, 1784.
 District of Maine; from Massachusetts; became the State of Maine, 1820.
 The Toledo Strip; the object of the nearly bloodless Toledo War between Ohio and Michigan; to Ohio, 1837.
 Washington District; from North Carolina; became the Southwest Territory, 1790.
 West Virginia; from Virginia; separating itself from the Confederacy, declared 1861; admitted to the Union in 1863.
 The Western Reserve; from Connecticut to the Northwest Territory (Ohio), 1800.
 The Yazoo lands; from Georgia to the Mississippi Territory, 1802.

Former organized territories

The following is a list of the 31 U.S. territories that have become states, in the order of the date organized. (All were considered incorporated.)
 Northwest Territory (1787–1803), became the state of Ohio, and the Territory of Indiana.
 Territory South of the River Ohio (also known as the Southwest Territory) (1790–1796) became the State of Tennessee.
 Territory of Mississippi (1798–1817) became the State of Mississippi and the Territory of Alabama.
 Territory of Indiana (1800–1816) split into the Illinois Territory, the Michigan Territory, and the State of Indiana.
 Territory of Orleans (1804–1812) became the State of Louisiana.
 Territory of Michigan (1805–1837) became State of Michigan and the Territory of Wisconsin.
 Territory of Louisiana (1805–1812) (preceded by the District of Louisiana), then renamed the Territory of Missouri.
 Territory of Illinois (1809–1818) split into the State of Illinois and additions to the Michigan Territory.
 Territory of Missouri (1812–1821) became the State of Missouri and Unorganized Territory (the eastern part of which was attached to the Territory of Michigan in 1834).
 Territory of Alabama (1817–1819) became State of Alabama.
 Territory of Arkansaw (1819–1836) became the State of Arkansas, additions to the unorganized territory of the original Louisiana Purchase, and the unorganized Indian Territory (which eventually spawned Indian Territory, Oklahoma Territory and No Man's Land).
 Territory of Florida (1822–1845) became the State of Florida.
 Territory of Wisconsin (1836–1848) split into the State of Wisconsin, the Iowa Territory and Unorganized Territory.
 Territory of Iowa (1838–1846) split into the State of Iowa and unorganized territory of the original Louisiana Purchase.
 Territory of Oregon (1848–1859) preceded by the unrecognized Oregon Country; split into the State of Oregon and Washington Territory.
 Territory of Minnesota (1849–1858) preceded (mostly) by unorganized territory of the original Louisiana Purchase; split into the State of Minnesota and unorganized territory of the original Louisiana Purchase.
 Territory of New Mexico (1850–1912) preceded by Nuevo Mexico (the southern part was known as the Arizona Territory (1861–1864) by the Confederate States of America); split into the Arizona Territory and the State of New Mexico.
 Territory of Utah (1850–1896) preceded by Alta California and the unrecognized State of Deseret; split into the State of Utah, the Nevada Territory, additions to the Colorado Territory and additions to the Wyoming Territory.
 Territory of Washington (1853–1889) became the State of Washington and additions to the Idaho Territory.
 Territory of Kansas (1854–1861) preceded by unorganized territory of the original Louisiana Purchase. Part became the modern State of Kansas; the western part became part of the Colorado Territory.
 Territory of Nebraska (1854–1867) preceded by unorganized territory of the original Louisiana Purchase; split into the State of Nebraska, the Dakota Territory, additions to the Idaho Territory and additions to the Colorado Territory.
 Territory of Colorado (1861–1876) preceded by parts of the territories of Kansas, Utah, New Mexico and Nebraska; became the State of Colorado. (See also Jefferson Territory.)
 Territory of Nevada (1861–1864) preceded by the Utah Territory and the unrecognized State of Deseret; became the State of Nevada.
 Territory of Dakota (1861–1889) became the State of North Dakota, the State of South Dakota, additions to the Idaho Territory and additions to the Wyoming Territory.
 Territory of Arizona (1863–1912) became the State of Arizona and an addition to the State of Nevada.
 Territory of Idaho (1863–1890) preceded by parts of the territories of Washington, Dakota, and Nebraska; became the State of Idaho, the Montana Territory, additions to the Dakota Territory and additions to the Wyoming Territory.
 Territory of Montana (1864–1889) became the State of Montana.
 Territory of Wyoming (1868–1890) preceded by parts of the territories of: Dakota, Utah and Idaho; became the State of Wyoming.
 Territory of Oklahoma (1890–1907) (preceded by the unorganized Indian Territory (1834–1907) and the Neutral Strip; became the State of Oklahoma.
 Territory of Hawaii (1898–1959) preceded by the Republic of Hawaii; became the State of Hawaii.
 Territory of Alaska (1912–1959) (preceded by the Department of Alaska and the District of Alaska); became the State of Alaska.

Internal land grants, cessions, districts, departments, claims and settlements

The following are land grants, cessions, defined districts (official or otherwise) or named settlements made within an area that was already part of a U.S. state or territory that did not involve international treaties or Native American cessions or land purchases.

 Cumberland District, North Carolina (also called the District of Miro); Tennessee.
 District of Louisiana; Missouri, Kansas, Iowa, Nebraska, Minnesota, North and South Dakota, Montana, Arkansas, Oklahoma, Colorado, Wyoming; renamed Missouri Territory in 1812.
 Military Tract of 1812; Illinois, Michigan, Arkansas, Missouri.
 Ohio Country; parts of Ohio, Indiana, Pennsylvania, West Virginia.

Alaska
 District of Alaska; renamed the Alaska Territory in 1912.

Colorado
 Pike's Peak Country

Iowa

 Half-Breed Tract
 Keokuk's Reserve

Nebraska
 Nemaha Half-Breed Reservation

New York

 Central New York Military Tract
 The Holland Purchase
 Macomb's Purchase
 Mill Yard Tract
 The Morris Reserve
 Phelps and Gorham Purchase
 The Triangle Tract

Ohio

 Canal Lands
 College Lands
 College Township
 Congress Lands (or Congressional Lands, 1798–1821)
 Congress Lands North of Old Seven Ranges
 Congress Lands West of Miami River
 Congress Lands East of Scioto River
 North and East of First Principal Meridian
 South and East of the First Principal Meridian
 Dohrman Tract
 Ephraim Kimberly Grant
 Firelands or Sufferers' Lands
 French Grant
 Indian Land Grants
 Maumee Road Lands
 Michigan meridian (or Michigan Meridian Survey; also Toledo Tract)
 Miami & Erie Canal Lands
 Ministerial Lands
 Moravian Indian Grants
 Gnadenhutten Tract
 Salem Tract
 Schoenbrunn Tract
 Ohio & Erie Canal Lands
 The Ohio Company
 Donation Tract
 First Purchase
 Purchase on the Muskingum (or Second Purchase)
 Refugee Tract
 Salt Reservations (or Salt Lands)
 School Lands
 Seven Ranges (or Old Seven Ranges)
 Symmes Purchase (or Miami Purchase; also the Land Between the Miamis)
 Turnpike Lands
 Twelve Mile Square Reservation
 Two Mile Square Reservation
 United States Military District
 Virginia Military District
 Zane's Tracts (or Zane's Grant; also Ebenezer Zane Tract)

Oklahoma

 Big Pasture
 Indian Territory or The Oklahoma Indian Country
 Neutral Strip (or No Man's Land)
 Unassigned Lands

Indian reserves
 The original and current Cherokee Nation
 Cheyenne–Arapaho Reserve
 Chickasaw Reserve
 Choctaw Reserve
 Comanche, Kiowa and Apache Reserve
 Creek Reserve
 Iowa Reserve
 Kaw Reserve
 Kickapoo Reserve
 Osage Reserve
 Ponca and Otoe–Missouria Reserve
 Citizen Potawatomi and Absentee Shawnee Reserve
 Sac and Fox Reserve
 Seminole Reserve
 Tonkawa Reserve
 Wichita and Caddo Reserve

Pennsylvania
 Erie Triangle
 New Purchase
 Walking Purchase
 Welsh Tract

Federal military districts and departments

These entities were sometimes the only governmental authority in the listed areas, although they often co-existed with civil governments in scarcely populated states and territories. Civilian administered "military" tracts, districts, departments, etc., will be listed elsewhere.

Central United States
 Department of the Northwest (1862–1865) Dakota, Minnesota, Montana, Wisconsin, Iowa, Nebraska
 District of Minnesota (1862–1865)
 District of Wisconsin (1862–1865)
 District of Iowa (1862–1865)
 District of Dakota (1862–1866)
 District of Montana (1864–1866)
 Department of the Missouri (1861–1865) Missouri, Arkansas, Illinois, part of Kentucky, and later Kansas; re-configured in 1865 as part of the Division of the Missouri.
 Division of the Missouri (1865–1891).
 Department of Dakota (1866–1911) Minnesota, Montana, North Dakota, and parts of Idaho, South Dakota and the Yellowstone portion of Wyoming.
 Department of the Missouri (1865–1891) Arkansas, Kansas, Missouri, Indian Territory, and Territory of Oklahoma.
 Department of the Platte (1866–1898) Iowa, Nebraska, Colorado, Dakota Territory, Utah Territory, Wyoming (except Yellowstone), and a portion of Idaho.
 Department of Texas (1871–1880) (originally part of the Department of the Gulf) Texas after 1865.
 Department of New Mexico (1854–65) New Mexico Territory; previously part of the District of California and the Department of the West.

Pacific area
 Pacific Division (1848–1853) lands won in the Mexican–American War; became the original Department of the Pacific in 1853.
 Military Department 10 (1848–1851) California.
 Military Department 11 (1848–1851) Oregon Territory.
 Department of the Pacific (1853–1858; and 1861–1865); separated into the Department of California and the Department of Oregon in 1858.
 District of Oregon (1853–1858) Washington Territory, Oregon Territory.
 District of California (1853–1858) California, New Mexico Territory; Utah added 1858

During the American Civil War, the Department of the Pacific had six subordinate military districts:
 District of Oregon (headquarters at Fort Vancouver) January 15, 1861 – July 27, 1865
 District of California (headquarters at San Francisco, co-located with Department of the Pacific). Independent command from Department from (July 1, 1864 – July 27, 1865); those parts of California not in other districts.
 District of Southern California (September 25, 1861 – July 27, 1865); Counties of Southern California (southward from San Luis Obispo and Tulare Counties).
 District of Humboldt (December 12, 1861 – July 27, 1865); Del Norte, Humboldt, Klamath, Mendocino Counties of California.
 District of Utah (August 6, 1862 – July 27, 1865);  Utah Territory, Nevada Territory, later State of Nevada.
 District of Arizona (March 7, 1865 – July 27, 1865); Territory of Arizona

The Department of California (1858–1861) comprised the southern part of the Department of the Pacific: California, Nevada, and southern part of Oregon Territory; merged into the Department of the Pacific as the District of California.

The Department of Oregon (1858–1861) comprised the northern part of the Department of the Pacific: Washington Territory and Oregon Territory.
 Military Division of the Pacific (1865–1891).
 Department of Alaska (1868–1884) became the civilian-ruled District of Alaska.
 Department of Arizona (1865–1891) Arizona Territory; included New Mexico Territory after 1885.
 Department of the Columbia  (1865–1891) Oregon, Washington Territory, part of Idaho Territory, and Alaska after 1870.
 District of Oregon (1865–1867) Washington Territory, Oregon Territory and Idaho Territory.
 New Department of California (1865–1891) California, Nevada Territory, Arizona Territory, and part of New Mexico Territory.

The south
 Department of the Gulf (1862–1865; created by the U.S. for the Civil War) Mississippi, Alabama, Louisiana, and Texas.
 Trans-Mississippi (or Trans-Mississippi Department; CSA) (1862–1865). Formerly "Military Dept. 2"; Missouri, Arkansas, Texas, Indian Territory (now Oklahoma), Kansas, and Louisiana west of the Mississippi River.

The west
 Department of the West (1853–1861): all U.S. lands between the Mississippi River and the Military District of the Pacific not included in other Districts or Departments.

Retroceded possessions and overseas territories

 The Milk River and Poplar River cessions to the United Kingdom (Treaty of 1818)
 Commonwealth of the Philippines to Republic of the Philippines (1946)
 Chamizal, Texas, to Mexico (1964)
 Swan Islands to Honduras (1971)
 Rio Rico, Texas, (Horcón Tract) to Mexico (1977)
 Panama Canal Zone to Panama (1979)
 Canton and Enderbury Islands (administered jointly with the U.K.) to Kiribati (1979)

U.S. military overseas regions
 United States Military Government in Cuba (1898–1902)
 United States Military Government in Guam (1898–1950)
 United States Military Government of the Philippine Islands (1898–1902)
 United States Military Government in Puerto Rico (1898–1900)
 United States Military Government in Cuba (1906-1909)
 United States Occupation of Veracruz, Mexico (1914)
 Allied Military Government for Occupied Territories (after World War II)
 American Occupation Zone of Austria (1945–1955)
 American Occupation Zone of Germany (1945–1949)
 American Occupation Zone of Berlin (1945–1990)
 Free Territory of Trieste, Zone A (1947–1954, administered jointly with the U.K.)
 American occupation of Japan (1945–1952)
 Iwo Jima, Japan (1945–1968)
 Ryukyu Islands, Japan (Okinawa, 1945–1972)
 American Occupation of South Korea (1945–1948)
 Pacific Trust Territories; included the Republic of Palau and the Marshall Islands (Micronesia under U.S. administration, 1947–1986)
 Coalition Provisional Authority, Iraq (2003–2004)

Functioning but non-sanctioned territories

These "territories" had actual, functioning governments (recognized or not):
 Cimarron Territory
 State of Deseret
 State of Frankland / Franklin
 Jefferson Territory
 Kansas Territory (1854–1861) had two different governments in different cities, pro-slavery and anti-slavery, each claiming to be the real, lawful government of the entire territory. Since Kansas entered the union as a free state in 1861, there has only been one capital, Topeka, Kansas. It entered as a free state in 1861 because the entire pro-slavery block in Congress, which would not have allowed this, had left to become the Confederacy.
 Long Republic
 Nataqua Territory
 Trans-Oconee Republic

Civil War-related

These are functioning governments created as a result of the attempted secession of the Confederacy during the American Civil War (1861–1865). Some were enclaves within enemy-held territories:
 Confederate States of America (CSA) – see map.
 Confederate Arizona (parts of the territories of Arizona and New Mexico)
 State of Dade
 Second Republic of South Carolina

These were regions disassociated from neighboring areas due to opposing views:
 Nickajack
 Free State of Jones
 Republic of Winston (see Winston County, Alabama)
 State of Scott, seceded from Tennessee and became a Union enclave (see Scott County, Tennessee)
 Town Line, New York
Free State of Van Zandt, seceded from Texas to be its own republic.

Regional nicknames

 Eastern United States
 The East Coast
 The Northeast
 New England
 Mid-Atlantic States
 The Burnt-Over District
 South Atlantic States
 Appalachia
 East North Central States
 The South
 Border States
 The Deep South
 Dixie
 The Midwest
 The Great Plains
 The Dust Bowl
 The West
 Mountain States
 The Rockies
 Inland Empire (Washington and Idaho)
 Great Basin
 The Southwest
 The Four Corners
 The West Coast
 The Pacific Northwest

Belts
Belts are loosely defined sub-regions found throughout the United States that are named for a perceived commonality among the included areas, which is often related to the region's economy or climate.

 Bible Belt
 Black Belt
 Borscht Belt
 Breadbasket of the United States
 Cotton Belt
 Grain Belt or Corn Belt
 Mormon Corridor or "Jello Belt"
 Lead Belt
 Rust Belt
 Snow Belt
 Sun Belt
 Tornado Alley

See also
 European colonization of the Americas
 List of former United States counties
 List of regions of the United States
 Political divisions of the United States
 Proposed states and territories of the United States
 Territorial evolution of the United States
 Territories of the United States on stamps
 United States territorial acquisitions

References

External links

 Official Name and Status History of the several States and U.S. Territories
 Indian Land Cessions in the United States, 1784–1894; United States Serial Set, Number 4015
 United States Territorial Maps 1775–1920
  (1 mi 30 sec)

 
 
United States
Colonization history of the United States
United States
United States
Geographic history of the United States
 
Proposed states and territories of the United States
Political divisions of the United States